This article concerns the morphology of the Albanian language, including the declension of nouns and adjectives, and the conjugation of verbs. It refers to the Tosk-based Albanian standard regulated by the Academy of Sciences of Albania.

Nouns (declension)

Albanian has three grammatical genders: masculine, feminine, and neuter. Nouns are morphologically altered for number (singular/plural), definiteness (indefinite/definite), and case. The cases are nominative, accusative, dative, ablative and vocative.  Many texts include a genitive case, but this is produced using a linking clitic (see below) and is morphologically identical to the dative.  The vocative is distinguished from the nominative in the case of only a few nouns. The dative and the ablative are identical, except for the indefinite plural.  The indefinite accusative is always the same as the indefinite nominative.

Plural formation

Albanian plural formation is highly irregular. Suffixes include -ra, -a, -e, -onj, -ë, but modification of the stem by final consonant palatalization and/or internal vowel mutation is common.

Some nouns, such as  "water", change gender in the plural.

Regular noun endings

The indefinite form of the noun is identical in the nominative and accusative cases, being the uninflected form of the noun in the singular, and the form noted above in the plural. The following are the endings for the dative and ablative cases when the noun is in indefinite form:

The endings for nouns in definite form are as follows:

The masculine nouns of "u" type are those whose uninflected form ends in a stressed front vowel or in -h, -k or -g.  Others are of "i" type.

For examples of noun declension patterns, see Albanian language (Grammar).

Pronouns

Personal pronouns

The personal pronouns decline for case, as do nouns; they have additional clitic (weak) forms in the accusative and dative. Older forms of the personal pronouns for the 3rd person in the ablative case are occasionally found.

Demonstrative pronoun
The declension of the demonstrative pronouns is very similar to that of the 3rd person personal pronouns. Older forms of demonstrative pronouns in the ablative are occasionally found.

Adjectives (declension)

The linking clitic

An Albanian noun phrase typically has the form "N Lnk (Adv*) Adj" where Lnk is the declinable particle described below.  (If adverbs appear between the adjective and the linking particle, then the latter must take its indefinite form.) The linking particle agrees with the noun in gender, case and number.

Indefinite linking clitic:

Definite linking clitic:

The adjectives themselves are also declined to agree with the noun in gender and number.  Paradigms differ depending on whether the adjective is or is not used with the linking particle.

Adjectives with the linking clitic

One group of adjectives uses the same form for all except the feminine plural, which uses the ending -a. Many of these adjectives end in -ë, such as mirë "good", thellë "deep" and bardhë "white".

The other does not differ by number, but has an -e on the feminine and none on the masculine. Many of these end in -m. Examples of these include zorshëm "hard, difficult", feminine zorshme.

Adjectives without the linking clitic

Some adjectives are used without the linking particle.  These take different endings from those that use the linking particle, and come in seven different types.

Each row is a different declension class.  Each cell labeled "?" indicates varied/irregular endings.

Verbs (conjugation)

In the active voice, Albanian morphologically alters the indicative present, imperfect and aorist, the optative present, and the admirative present and imperfect (with 6 person/number inflections for each), as well as the imperative (2nd person singular and plural) and a participle (indeclinable).  (The admirative endings are regular across conjugational classes and are similar to forms of the auxiliary kam.)  All other mood/tense/aspect combinations are produced periphrastically using the auxiliary kam (have) and indeclinable particles.  The Albanian passive voice continues the Indo-European medio-passive, and has separate declension paradigms for the indicative present and imperfect, as well as the imperative.  The other forms are produced from these and from the active forms periphrastically.

Regular paradigms (active voice)

Class 1

Imperative: Singular -o, Plural -oni

Participle: -uar

Class 2

Imperative: Singular -, Plural -ni

Participle: -ur

Class 3

Imperative: Singular -, Plural -ni

Participle: -tur

Irregular verbs
Most proper Albanian verbs are irregular since they change their only vowel of the stem, often rearranging consonant order or by changing the stem completely. Verbs of foreign origin like studioj, kandidoj, refuzoj, provoj, etc. are regular. Verbs derived from nouns, like ndryshoj (from ndryshe, different), vlerësoj (from vlerë, value), are normally regular. Here are some examples of irregular verbs:

kam ‘have’ (auxiliary) (I have, you have, I had (aorist), I had (simple perfect), I (wish to) have, (imperative) have!, had (participle).jam ‘be’ (auxiliary)shoh, to see

ha, to eat

rri, to stay

vij, to come

bie, to fall

flas, to speak

them, to say

Bibliography
 Buchholz, Oda & Wilfried Fiedler. Albanische Grammatik. Leipzig: VEB Verlag Enzyklopädie, 1987.
 Camaj, Martin. Albanische Wortbildung. Wiesbaden: Otto Harrassowitz, 1966.
 Camaj, Martin. Albanian Grammar. Trans. Leonard Fox. Wiesbaden: Otto Harrassowitz, 1984.
 Gut, Christian, Agnés Brunet-Gut & Remzi Përnaska. Parlons albanais. Paris: L'Harmattan, 1999.
 Hubbard, Phillip L. The Syntax of the Albanian Verb Complex. New York–London: Garland Publishing, 1985.
 Mann, Stuart E. An Albanian Historical Grammar. Hamburg: Helmut Buske, 1977.
 Newmark, Leonard, Philip Hubbard, & Peter Prifti. Standard Albanian: A Reference Grammar for Students. Stanford: Stanford University Press, 1982.
 Newmark, Leonard & Vladimir Dervishi. Albanian Handbook with English and Albanian Glossaries. Kensington, MD: Dunwoody Press, 1999.
 Neziroski, Fatime. Manuel de conjugaison des verbes albanais. Paris–Budapest–Torino: L'Harmattan, 2003.
 Ressuli, Namik. Grammatica albanese. Bologna: Pàtron, 1986.
 Zymberi, Isa. Colloquial Albanian. London–New York: Routledge, 1991.

Albanian language
Indo-European grammars
Linguistic morphology